The Amhara Democratic Party (ADP), originally known as Amhara National Democratic Movement (ANDM), was a political party in Ethiopia. The party was one of four members of the Ethiopian People's Revolutionary Democratic Front (EPRDF) that ruled Ethiopia at the time. In 2012, the party chairman was Demeke Mekonnen, who replaced Addisu Legesse in 2010. In November 2019, prime minister Abiy Ahmed, holding the role of EPRDF chair, unified the constituent parties of the coalition into a new party called Prosperity Party.

History
The Ethiopian People's Democratic Movement (EPDM), the precursor of ANDM, was founded by former members of the Ethiopian People's Revolutionary Party (EPRP) and supported by the Tigray People's Liberation Front (TPLF). It was originally based in Waghimra in Wollo Province, and waged an armed struggle against the Derg in that area starting in 1982. EPDM convened its first organizational conference in Jerba Yohannes, Waghimra, in November 1983. During the Ethiopian civil war, its military headquarters were located in a cave in Melfa (Dogu'a Tembien). In 1989 EPDM and its long-time ally TPLF united to form the Ethiopian People's Revolutionary Democratic Front (EPDRF). At its third organizational conference in 1994, the EPDM changed its name to Amhara National Democratic Movement (ANDM), marking its transition from a pan-Ethiopian movement to an ethnic party.  In the May 2010 Regional State Council elections, the ANDM won all 294 seats in the Amhara Region.

On its annual conference on 30 September 2018, Amhara National Democratic Movement changed its title to Amhara Democratic Party.

See also 
:Category:Amhara Democratic Party politicians

References

1982 establishments in Ethiopia
2019 disestablishments in Ethiopia
Defunct political parties in Ethiopia
Ethiopian People's Revolutionary Democratic Front
Ethnic political parties in Ethiopia
Factions of the Ethiopian Civil War
Political parties disestablished in 2019
Political parties established in 1982
Rebel groups in Ethiopia